π Fornacis (Latinised as Pi Fornacis) is the Bayer designation for a binary star system in the southern constellation of Fornax. It has an apparent visual magnitude of 5.360, which is bright enough to be seen with the naked eye on a dark night. With an annual parallax shift of 11.08 mas, it is estimated to lie around 294 light years from the Sun. At that distance, the visual magnitude is diminished by an interstellar absorption factor of 0.10 due to dust.

This system is a member of the thin disk population of the Milky Way galaxy. The primary, component A, is an evolved G-type giant star with a stellar classification of G8 III. It has an estimated mass slightly higher than the Sun, but has expanded to more than nine times the Sun's radius. The star is roughly five billion years old and is spinning slowly with a projected rotational velocity of 0.9 km/s. Pi Fornacis A radiates 57.5 times the solar luminosity from its outer atmosphere at an effective temperature of 5,048 K.

A companion, component B, was discovered in 2008 using the AMBER instrument of the Very Large Telescope facility. The preliminary orbital period for the pair is 11.4 years, and the semimajor axis is at least 70 mas. The orbit is highly inclined to the line of sight from the Earth.

References

G-type giants
Binary stars
Fornax (constellation)
Fornacis, Pi
CD-30 703
012438
09440
594